Ethnic groups in Algeria include Arabs and Berbers, who represent 99% of the population, of which 85% are Arab and 15% are Berber. Algeria also has a minority population of Europeans that represents less than 1% of the population. The minority European population is predominantly of French, Spanish, and Italian descent.

Arabs

Berbers

The minority Berbers are divided into groups, which are the Kabyles, Chaouis, Chenouas, Mozabites, and Tuareg. They have interacted with Phoenicians and Romans for centuries. Christianized in Late Antiquity during the Christianization of the Roman Empire, the Berbers became Arabized and Islamized after the Muslim conquest of the Maghreb under the Rashidun and Umayyad Caliphate.

Beginning with the Numidian kingdom till the Middle-Ages, Berbers had extensive historical relationships with both Romans and Phoenicians who eventually build Carthage in their own lands. Partially Romanized and Christianized during the Roman Empire, the Berbers and their lands were Islamized in the 7th century with the expansion of the Umayyad Empire from Syria. Previous Roman-Berber cities gradually began to become Arabo-Berber cities where an Arabo-Islamic culture was involved. Arabization was considered as a low phenomenon, mostly due to cultural and economical exchanges between the new Maghreb and the old Mashreq of the Arab world until the 12th century with the immigration of the Bedouin tribe Banu Hilal expanded their cultural influence towards the inland areas. Within the few centuries later, the linguistical Arabization of the Maghreb became much more important and dominant.

Other ethnic groups

Algeria was the home of a significant Jewish community, most of which fled after Algeria's independence, with about 70,000 Jews emigrating to France and 10,000 to Israel in that period.

See also
 Languages of Algeria

References